is a passenger railway station located in the city of Himeji, Hyōgo Prefecture, Japan, operated by the West Japan Railway Company (JR West).

Lines

Station layout
The station consists of one ground-level side platform and one ground-level island platform connected by a footbridge. The station is staffed.

Platforms

History
Gochaku Station was opened on 18 April 1900. With the privatization of the Japan National Railways (JNR) on 1 April 1987, the station came under the aegis of the West Japan Railway Company.

Station numbering was introduced in March 2018 with Gochaku being assigned station number JR-A83.

Passenger statistics
In fiscal 2019, the station was used by an average of 2900 passengers daily

Surrounding area
Harima Kokubun-ji Ruins
Danbayama Kofun
 National Route 2
 National Route 312

See also
List of railway stations in Japan

References

External links

 JR West Station Official Site

Railway stations in Himeji
Sanyō Main Line
Railway stations in Japan opened in 1900